Lewis Vital Bogy (April 9, 1813September 20, 1877) was a United States senator from Missouri. Born in Ste. Geneviève, he attended the public schools, was employed as clerk in a mercantile establishment, studied law in Illinois, graduated from Transylvania University (Lexington, Kentucky in 1835 and commenced practice in St. Louis. He served in the Black Hawk War, was a member of the board of aldermen of St. Louis in 1838, and was a member of the Missouri House of Representatives in 1840–1841 and 1854–1855. He was commissioner of Indian Affairs in 1866 and 1867, and president of the city council of St. Louis in 1872. Bogy was one of the founders of the St. Louis Iron Mountain Railway, acting as president for two years.

Bogy was elected as a Democrat to the U.S. Senate and served from March 4, 1873, until his death in St. Louis in 1877; he was buried at Calvary Cemetery section 1.

See also
List of United States Congress members who died in office (1790–1899)

Notes

References

1813 births
1877 deaths
American people of Acadian descent
Democratic Party members of the Missouri House of Representatives
Democratic Party United States senators from Missouri
Transylvania University alumni
Burials at Calvary Cemetery (St. Louis)
19th-century American politicians